Loudoun Times-Mirror is a weekly newspaper based in Leesburg, Virginia, owned and operated by Peter Arundel. It has covered local news, sports, business and community in Loudoun County and Leesburg for more than two centuries.

In November 2015,  Loudoun Times-Mirror acquired the assets of the weekly newspapers, Leesburg Today, Ashburn Today, and the website leesburgtoday.com.

References

External links 

Newspapers published in Virginia